Mario He (Born 3 August 1993, Rankweil, Austria) is an Austrian professional pool player. He is a former winner of the European Pool Championships, and winner of both the 2017 and 2019 World Cup of Pool events alongside Albin Ouschan.

Career
He has won four Euro Tour events, the first in 2016, at the North Cyprus Open 2016, and later the 2017 Austrian Open, and in 2018 both the 2018 Veldhoven Open, and 2018 Klagenfurt Open. With four victories overall, He is in the top 10 winners of Euro Tour events.

He was set to represent Europe for the first time at the 2018 Mosconi Cup, however, he withdrew from the team, due to a failed drugs test. Having previously reached the final of the 9-ball 2011 European Pool Championships, He won the 2012 European Pool Championships in 8-Ball defeating Artem Koschowyj of the Ukraine in the final. He won the final in an 8–0 whitewash.

In 2017, alongside Albin Ouschan, He won the 2017 World Cup of Pool. Entering the tournament as second seeds, the team defeated Sweden (7–5), Russia (7–2), England (9–7) and third seed China (9–1) on route to the final. In the final, they played the USA team of Shane Van Boening, and Skyler Woodward, who defeated the first seeded team of Chinese Taipei in the semi-final. The Austrian team prevailed in the final, winning the final 10–6.

Personal life
Outside of pool, He is also a chess player, where he was a young state champion.

Titles & Achievements
 2022 Euro Tour Italian Open
 2021 Pro Billiard Series Ohio Open 
 2021 European Pool Championship 8-Ball
 2019 World Cup of Pool - with (Albin Ouschan)
 2019 Euro Tour Veldhoven Open
 2018 Euro Tour Klagenfurt Open 
 2018 Euro Tour Veldhoven Open
 2017 Euro Tour North Cyprus Open
 2017 World Cup of Pool - with (Albin Ouschan)
 2016 Euro Tour Austria Open
 2012 European Pool Championship 8-Ball
 2015 Austrian Pool Championship 9-Ball
 2015 Austrian Pool Championship 14.1
 2015 Austrian Pool Championship 10-Ball
 2014 Austrian Pool Championship 8-Ball
 2014 Austrian Pool Championship 9-Ball
 2013 Austrian Pool Championship 10-Ball
 2013 Austrian Pool Championship 14.1
 2013 Austrian Pool Championship 8-Ball
 2011 Austrian Pool Championship 8-Ball
 2011 Austrian Pool Championship 10-Ball
 2010 Austrian Pool Championship 8-Ball

References

External links

1993 births
Living people
Austrian pool players
People from Feldkirch District
Sportspeople from Vorarlberg